On the Outside is the third studio album by British rock band Starsailor.  The album was released on 17 October 2005. It was led by the first single, "In the Crossfire" on 3 October 2005. On the Outside has been certified Silver in the UK.

The song "Jeremiah" was written about the death of Jeremiah Duggan, James Walsh having heard Duggan's mother talking about it on the radio.

Track listing
"In the Crossfire" - 3:16
"Counterfeit Life" - 3:31
"In My Blood" - 3:55
"Faith Hope Love" - 2:48
"I Don’t Know" - 3:20
"Way Back Home" - 3:10
"Keep Us Together" - 3:47
"Get Out While You Can" - 3:07
"This Time" - 3:32
"White Light" - 4:34
"Jeremiah" - 3:39
"Empty Streets" - 3:36

Chart positions

References

External links
This Time music video

2005 albums
Starsailor (band) albums
Albums produced by Rob Schnapf